In politics, a martyr is someone who suffers persecution and/or death for advocating, renouncing, refusing to renounce, and/or refusing to advocate a political belief or cause.

Examples

Sovereignty

The Manchester Martyrs were three Irishmen executed after being condemned for association with the killing of a policeman in Manchester, England in 1867. The day after the executions, Frederick Engels wrote to Karl Marx: "Yesterday morning the Tories, by the hand of Mr Calcraft, accomplished the final act of separation between England and Ireland. The only thing that the Fenians still lacked were martyrs. ... To my knowledge, the only time that anybody has been executed for a similar matter in a civilised country was the case of John Brown at Harpers Ferry. The Fenians could not have wished for a better precedent." Ten Irish Republican Army  members died during a 1981 hunger strike, including Bobby Sands.

The Belfiore martyrs (in Italian, Martiri di Belfiore) were a group of Italian pro-independence fighters condemned to death by hanging in 1853 during the Italian Risorgimento. They included Tito Speri and the priest Enrico Tazzoli and are named after the site where the sentence was carried out, in the valley of Belfiore at the south entrance to Mantua.

Unionism
The Tolpuddle Martyrs were a group of 19th century agricultural labourers in Dorset, England, who were arrested for and convicted of swearing a secret oath as members of the Friendly Society of Agricultural Labourers. The rules of the society showed it was clearly structured as a friendly society, that is, a mutual association for the purposes of insurance, pensions, savings or cooperative banking; and it operated as a trade-specific benefit society. But at the time, friendly societies had strong elements of what are now considered to be the principal role of trade unions, and wages were at issue. The Tolpuddle Martyrs were sentenced not to death but to transportation to Australia, a harsh form of exile.

Communism

In the People's Republic of China, people who died in the cause of the Communist Partymost particularly the many victims of the 1927 Shanghai massacre but also including devoted humanitarians during the Chinese Civil War such as the Canadian physician Tillson Harrisonare honored and commemorated as martyrs. The red scarf worn by the 100+ million Young Pioneers honors their spilt blood. Jiang Zhuyun and Liu Hulan are notable female martyrs who have been commemorated in various media. Notable monuments include the Monument to the People's Heroes at the confluence of Suzhou Creek and the Huangpu River in central Shanghai and the Longhua Martyrs' Memorial.

Many communist activists have died as martyrs in India, due to their allegiance to various communist parties, such as the CPI(M) and the CPI. Most of them hail from mainly leftist states such as Kerala, and Tripura. In Kerala, many are killed in protests by the police, and some are assassinated by activists in other political parties, such as the INC and the RSS. The district of Kannur has reported to have had the most political murders. Here, the RSS are known to have used brutal violence to eliminate CPI(M) workers.

Civil rights movement
In the United States, the assassinations of Malcolm X in 1965 and Martin Luther King Jr. in 1968 have been linked to their leadership in movements to improve the rights and quality of life of black citizens, Black Nationalism and the Civil Rights Movement respectively.

Notable examples

1649 – Charles is regarded by many members of the Church of England as a martyr because, it is said, he was offered his life if he would abandon the historic episcopacy in the Church of England. It is said he refused, however, believing that the Church of England was truly "Catholic" and should maintain the Catholic episcopate. His designation in the Church of England's calendar is "Charles, King and Martyr, 1649". Mandell Creighton, Bishop of London, wrote "Had Charles been willing to abandon the Church and give up episcopacy, he might have saved his throne and his life.
1793 – Jean-Paul Marat, a French Jacobin assassinated by Charlotte Corday.
1835 – King Hintsa kaKhawuta, a Xhosa monarch who was shot and killed while attempting to escape captivity during Sixth Frontier War, also known as the Hintsa War.
1859 – John Brown, a militant abolitionist who was executed after his raid on Harper’s Ferry. Many abolitionists of the time extolled him as a martyr.
1865 – Abraham Lincoln, the 16th U.S. President. Assassinated by a Confederate sympathizer after the end of the American Civil War.
1881 – James Garfield, 20th U. S. President. Shot and killed by an office seeker. Considered one of the people who died for corruption to end.

References

Political activism
Cultural aspects of death